Los Llanos is a corregimiento in Ocú District, Herrera Province, Panama with a population of 2,110 as of 2010. Its population as of 1990 was 3,166; its population as of 2000 was 2,416.

References

Corregimientos of Herrera Province